The following is a list of international television shows franchises. These are shows remade for foreign markets rather than adaptations.

Reality shows

 10 Years Younger
 30 Seconds to Fame
 The Amazing Race
 All Together Now
 American Inventor
 BBQ Champ
 The Apprentice
 The Bachelor
 The Bachelorette
 The Bar
 Beauty and the Geek
 Big Brother
 The Biggest Loser
 The Block
 The Bus
 The Four: Battle for Stardom
 But Can They Sing?
 Chance of a Lifetime
 Celebrity Duets
 Chains of Love
 Clash of the Choirs
 Come Dine with Me
 The Contender
 The Dating Game
 Dance Your Ass Off
 Dancing on Ice
 Dancing with the Stars 
 Dating in the Dark
 Dragons' Den
 The Doctors
 Estate of Panic
 Ex on the Beach
 Expedition Robinson 
 Extreme Makeover
 Entertainment Tonight
 The Face
 Face Off
 The Farm
 Fashion Star
 Farmer Wants a Wife
 Fear Factor
 Flip or Flop
 Football's Next Star
 Get The F*ck Out Of My House
 Got Talent
 Got to Dance
 The Great British Bake Off
 Hell's Kitchen
 Hello Goodbye
 Hotter Than My Daughter
 Idols
 I'm a Celebrity...Get Me Out of Here!
 Iron Chef
 I Get That a Lot
 Just the Two of Us
 The Insider
 King of the Nerds
 Little Big Shots
 Lego Masters
 MasterChef
 The Marriage Ref
 The Mole
 Married at First Sight
 Momma's Boys
 More to Love
 Murder in Small Town X
 Must Love Kids
 Overhaulin'
 Pelotón
 Pimp My Ride
 Popstars
 Project Runway
 Ramsay's Kitchen Nightmares
 Ready Steady Cook
 The Real Housewives
 Drag Race
 Revenge Body with Khloé Kardashian
 Reality Circus
 The Rebel Billionaire: Branson's Quest for the Best
 Rising Star
 RuPaul's Drag Race
 Sasuke/Ninja Warrior
 Secret Millionaire
 Shark Tank
 Shear Genius
 The Simple Life
 Sing If You Can
 So You Think You Can Dance
 Solitary
 Splash!
 Star Academy
 Strictly Come Dancing
 Survivor
 Supernanny
 Saturday Night Live
 The Taste
 Temptation Island
 The Tester
 Top Chef
 Top Design
 Top Model
 Trading Spouses
 Tycoon
 The Ultimate Fighter
 Unan1mous
 Undercover Boss
 Való Világ
 The Voice
 What Not to Wear
 Wife Swap
 Whose Line Is It Anyway?
 The Winner Is
 The X Factor
 Your Face Sounds Familiar

Game shows

 1 vs. 100
 101 Ways to Leave a Gameshow
 20Q
 50-50
 5 Gold Rings
 500 Questions
 Amne$ia
 Are You Smarter Than a 5th Grader?
 Anything Goes
 Beat The Blondes
 Beat the Star
 Boom!
 Bowling for Dollars
 Brain Wall
 Brainiest
 Breakaway
 Can't Cook, Won't Cook
 Cash Cab
 Catch 21
 The Chair
 The Chamber
 The Chase
 The Colour of Money
 Countdown
 Cresus
 The Cube
 Deal or No Deal
 Dialing for Dollars
 Distraction
 Divided
 Dog Eat Dog
 Don't Ask Me Ask Britain
 Don't Forget the Lyrics!
 Don't Lose the Money
 Eggheads
 Ellen's Game of Games
 Every Second Counts
 Everybody's Equal
 Family Feud
 Five Minutes to a Fortune
 Fort Boyard
 Friend or Foe?
 Gameshow Marathon
 Going for Gold
 Grand Slam
 Greed
 Guesstimation
 Hollywood Squares
 I Can See Your Voice
 I Love My Country
 I Survived a Japanese Game Show
 Identity
 In It to Win It
 It's Not What You Know
 It's Your Chance of a Lifetime
 Jeopardy!
 The Kids Are All Right
 Knowitalls
 Let's Make a Deal
 Lingo
 The Lyrics Board
 Mastermind
 Match Game / Blankety Blank
 Mental Samurai
 Million Dollar Minute
 Million Dollar Password
 The Million Pound Drop / Million Dollar Money Drop
 Minute to Win It
 My Dad Is Better Than Your Dad
 Name That Tune
 Nothing But the Truth
 Only Connect
 Opportunity Knocks
 Peking Express
 Password
 The People Versus
 The People's Quiz
 The Phone
 Pointless
 PokerFace
 Power of 10
 The Price Is Right
 Pyramid
 Queen for a Day
 A Question of Genius
 Quizmania
 Raid the Cage
 Rebound
 Red or Black?
 Reflex
 Riot
 Rolling In It
 Russian Roulette
 Sale of the Century
 Scream! If You Know the Answer
 Set for Life
 Show Me the Money
 The Singing Bee
 Singled Out
 Spin Star
 Super Fan
 Supermarket Sweep
 Take It or Leave It
 Taken Out
 Takeshi's Castle
 Test the Nation
 That's the Question
 Tic-Tac-Dough
 Touch the Truck
 Trust
 Twenty One
 The Vault
 Vendredi tout est permis
 The Wall
 The Weakest Link
 What? Where? When?
 Wheel of Fortune
 Who Wants to Be a Millionaire?
 Who Wants to Be a Millionaire? Hot Seat
 The Whole 19 Yards
 Who's Still Standing?
 Winning Lines
 Wipeout
 XXS
 You Deserve It

American television series

 Running Wild with Bear Grylls
 Hollywood Squares
 Everybody Loves Raymond
 Pretty Little Liars
 Baby Daddy
 The Amazing Race
 Grey's Anatomy
 The Amazing Race
 Minute to Win It
 Designated Survivor
 Designated Survivor: 60 Days
 Entourage
 Jane the Virgin
 King of the Nerds
 Fashion Star
 Bet on Your Baby
 Wipeout
 Gossip Girl
 Ultimate Tag
 Desperate Housewives
 Mental Samurai
 Ellen's Game of Games
 Repeat After Me
 Little Big Shots
 The Ellen DeGeneres Show

The King of Queens 
The international rights are distributed by CBS Studios International and Sony Pictures Television.

Little Big Shots 
The international rights are distributed by Warner Bros. International Television Production.

Celebrity Game Face 

A Arabic version of Celebrity Game Face  titled تحدي النجوم Celebrity Face Games تحدي النجوم - Celebrity Game Face تحدي النجوم Celebrity Game Face  airs in the Arabic on Abu Dhabi TV Abu Dhabi TV, and the ADtv app, part of Abu Dhabi Media (ADM) and is hosted by Shaimaa Seif and is produced by InMedia Plus has aired on the network originally on February 17, 2021

Arabic game shows

 الحصن
 وين ما تكون

Sitcoms

All in the Family / Till Death Us Do Part
Original name: Till Death Us Do Part
Origin: United Kingdom
Date started: 1965
Date ended: 1975
Creator: Johnny Speight (Norman Lear is credited as "creator" in U.S. adaptation and most U.S. spinoffs)
First network to broadcast: BBC One
First network to adapt: United States
Related series (UK): The Thoughts of Chairman Alf, Nobody's Perfect
Related series (US): Maude, The Jeffersons, Gloria, 704 Hauser
Second-generation related series (US):  Good Times, Checking In

The Beverly Hillbillies
Original name: The Beverly Hillbillies
Origin: United States
Date started: 1962
Date ended: 1971
Creator: Paul Henning’First network to broadcast: CBS
Related series: Petticoat Junction, Green AcresBewitched
Original name: BewitchedOrigin: United StatesDate started: 1964
Date ended: 1972
Creator: Sol SaksFirst network to broadcast: ABCFirst country to adapt: India (2002)

Note: The Japanese anime series Oku-sama wa Mahō Shōjo: Bewitched Agnes (My Wife is a Magical Girl: Bewitched Agnes) and Sally, the Witch were homages to Bewitched, not a remake or an updated reimagining of the US series.

The Brady Bunch
Original name: The Brady BunchOrigin: United StatesDate started: 1969
Date ended: 1974
Creator(s): Sherwood SchwartzFirst network to broadcast: ABC
Related series: The Brady Kids, The Brady Bunch Variety Hour, The Brady Brides, The Bradys, plus two TV movies and two feature films

Cheers
Original name: CheersOrigin: United StatesDate started: September 30, 1982
Date ended: May 20, 1993
Creator(s): James Burrows, Glen Charles, Les CharlesFirst network to broadcast: NBC
Related series: The Tortellis, Frasier

The Cosby Show
Original name: The Cosby ShowOrigin: United StatesDate started: September 20, 1984
Date ended: July 9, 1992
Creator(s): Ed. Weinberger, Michael Leeson, Bill CosbyFirst network to broadcast: NBC
Related series: A Different World

Diff’rent Strokes
Original name: Diff'rent StrokesOrigin: United StatesDate started: 1978
Date ended: 1986
Creator(s): Bud YorkinFirst network to broadcast: NBC
Related spin-off series: The Facts of Life 
Related series: Hello, Larry, Silver Spoons, Double Trouble, It's Your Move

Easy Aces
Original name: Easy AcesOrigin: United StatesDate started: 1930
Date ended: 1945
Creator: Goodman Ace
First network to broadcast: CBS Radio Network 
First network to adapt: CanadaFree Agents
Original name: Free AgentsOrigin: United KingdomDate started: 2007
Creator: Chris NielFirst network to broadcast: Channel 4First country to adapt: United States (2011)

The Golden Girls
Original name: The Golden GirlsOrigin: United StatesDate started: 1985
Date ended: 1993
Creator: Susan HarrisFirst network to broadcast: NBCFirst network to adapt: United KingdomRelated series: Empty Nest, Nurses

Desperate Housewives
Original name: Desperate HousewivesOrigin: United StatesDate started: 2004
Date ended: 2012
Creator: Marc CherryGeneral Manager: Giovanni MastrangeloProduction companies: ABC StudiosDisney–ABC International TelevisionDistributor: Disney–ABC Domestic TelevisionFirst network to broadcast: ABCFirst network to adapt: Argentina (2006)
Related series: Devious Maids

Theme music composer
 Danny Elfman

Composers
 Steve Bartek
 Stewart Copeland
 Steve Jablonsky

Production companies 
 ABC Studios

Distributed By
 ABC Studios

In association with
 ABC Studios

Produced By
 ABC Studios

Distributor
 Disney–ABC Domestic Television

Related shows
 Desperate HousewivesDesperate Housewives , also known as Desperate HW, is based on a version of the American television series, Desperate Housewives created by Marc Cherry and produced by ABC Studios
It is an adaptation of the American series, Desperate Housewives, that aired from 2004 to 2012; the show has been minimally adapted; from character names to the main plot but the main characters play the same roles as the characters in the original version.Desperate Housewives is a television series television format created by Marc Cherry, which originated with Desperate Housewives in October 2004. The format was revived and updated for the ABC.

Adaptations
On February 26, 2007, The Walt Disney Company announced that four South American versions of the show were about to begin production: one for Argentina, one for Colombia, one for Ecuador and one for Brazil. Later on, the Colombian and Ecuadorean productions merged, leaving three Latin American shows. The Argentine version, titled Amas de Casa Desesperadas, began being broadcast in 2006. The first year proved successful enough for a second season to begin production. The first season of the version for Colombia (RCN TV) and Ecuador (Teleamazonas), also titled Amas de Casa Desesperadas, began being broadcast in Ecuador in May 2007, and was broadcast five days a week. The Brazilian version, Donas de Casa Desesperadas began being broadcast on RedeTV! in 2008. The Turkish version titled Umutsuz Ev Kadınları aired on Kanal D in Turkey from 2011 until 2012 and on FOX Turkey from 2012 until 2014. In fall 2013, the Disney Media Distribution and the Nigerian television network EbonyLife TV announced that they were producing an African version of Desperate Housewives. The series, titled Desperate Housewives Africa, was scheduled to premiere in summer 2014 on EbonyLife TV. However, it aired its only season during 2015.

General Manager
 Giovanni Mastrangelo

Created by
 Marc Cherry

Created and written by
 Marc Cherry

Written By
 Marc Cherry
 Jason Ganzel
 Jenna Bans
 Joshua Senter
 Dahvi Waller
 Kevin Etten
 Brian Tanen
 Alexandra Cunningham
 Bob Daily
 John Pardee
 Joey Murphy
 Wendy Mericle
 Matt Berry
 Kevin Murphy
 Tom Spezialy
 Jeff Greenstein
 Joe Keenan
 Jamie Gorenberg
 David Flebotte
 Marco Pennette
 David Schladweiler
 Chuck Ranberg
 Anne Flett-Giordano
 Susan Nirah Jaffee
 Chris Black
 Lori Kirkland Baker
 John Paul Bullock III
 Cindy Appel
 Christian McLaughlin
 Peter Lefcourt
 Jeffrey Richman
 Jim Lincoln
 Scott Sanford Tobis
 Valerie Ahern
 Brian A. Alexander
 Patty Lin
 Tracey Stern
 Adam Barr
 Alan Cross
 Katie Ford
 Ellen Herman
 David Schulner
 Oliver Goldstick
 Sheila R. Lawrence
 Valerie Brotski
 Bruce Zimmerman
 Sara Parriott
 Josann McGibbon
 Annie Weisman

Doogie Howser, M.D.
Original name: Doogie Howser, M.D.Origin: United StatesDate started: 1985
Date ended: 1989
Creator: Steven Bochco & David E. KelleyFirst network to broadcast: ABCRebooted version: Doogie Kameāloha, M.D. (2021; character is nicknamed after the original series character's nickname)

Rules of Engagement
Original name: Rules of EngagementOrigin: United StatesDate started: 2007
Date ended: 2013
Creator: Tom HertzFirst network to broadcast: CBSFirst country to adapt: Poland (2012)

The King of Queens
Original name: The King of QueensOrigin: United StatesDate started: 1998
Date ended: 2007
Creator: Michael J. WeithornDavid LittFirst network to broadcast: CBSFirst country to adapt: Russia (2011)

See also
 Молодожёны (20112012), Russian adaptation of the sitcom The King of Queens.
 Newlyweds (20112012), Russian adaptation of the sitcom The King of Queens.

Happy Days
Name: Happy DaysOriginal name: New Family in Town (original pilot)
Origin: United StatesDate started: February 25, 1972
Date ended: September 24, 1984
Creator: Garry MarshallFirst network to broadcast: ABC
Related series: Laverne & Shirley, Blansky's Beauties, Mork & Mindy, Out of the Blue, Joanie Loves Chachi
Second-generation related series: The Fonz and the Happy Days Gang, Laverne & Shirley in the Army, Mork & Mindy/Laverne & Shirley/Fonz Hour
Other franchise ties: Love, American Style

Kath & Kim
Original name: Kath & KimOrigin: AustraliaDate started: 2002
Creator: Jane Turner and Gina RileyFirst network to broadcast: ABC (Australia)First country to adapt: United States (2008)

The Nanny
Original name: The NannyOrigin: United StatesDate started: 1993
Date ended: 1999
Creator: Fran DrescherFirst network to broadcast: CBSFirst country to adapt: Turkey (2001)

Married... with Children
Original name: Married... with ChildrenOrigin: United StatesDate started: 1987
Date ended: 1997
Creator: Michael G. Moye andRon LeavittFirst network to broadcast: FoxFirst country to adapt: Germany (1993)

Modern Family
Original name: Modern FamilyOrigin: United StatesDate started: 2009
Date ended: 2020
Creator: Christopher Lloyd andSteven LevitanFirst network to broadcast: ABCFirst country to adapt: Iran, as Haft Sang (2014; 20th Century Fox did not authorize the production of this series, and it is a frame-by-frame remake of the American version.)

Man with a Plan
Original name: Man with a PlanOrigin: United StatesDate started: 2016
Date ended: 2020
Creator: Jackie FilgoJeff Filgo and Jackie and Jeff FilgoFirst network to broadcast: CBSFirst country to adapt: Ukraine, as Батько рулить / Папа рулитInternational versions

International versions

Phua Chu Kang Pte Ltd
Original name: Phua Chu Kang Pte LtdOrigin: SingaporeDate started: 1997
Date ended: 2007
Creator(s): Andrea Teo, Kenneth LangFirst network to broadcast: MediaCorp TV Channel 5
First country to adapt: Malaysia, as Phua Chu Kang Sdn Bhd (2010)
Related series: Living with Lydia, Calefare

Sit Down, Shut Up
Original name: Sit Down, Shut UpOrigin: AustraliaDate started: 2001
Date ended: 2001
Creator: Tim McLoughlan and Brendan ReedFirst network to broadcast: Ten NetworkFirst country to adapt: United States (2009)

Steptoe and Son / Sanford and Son
Original name: Steptoe and SonOriginal name: Sanford and SonOrigin: United Kingdom Date started: 1962
 Date ended: 2016
Creator: Ray Galton and Alan Simpson
First network to broadcast: BBC 1
First country to adapt: United States Related series: Sanford Arms, Grady, Sanford

White Van Man
Original name: White Van ManOrigin: United KingdomDate started: 2010
Date ended: 2012
Creator: Adrian PoyntonFirst network to broadcast: BBC ThreeFirst country to adapt: United States (2012)

Soap operas and telenovelas

Betty La Fea
Original name: Yo soy Betty, la fea / Betty La FeaOrigin: ColombiaDate started: 1999Date ended: 2001Creator: Fernando GaitánFirst network to broadcast: RCN TVFirst country to adapt: Israel (2003)Related series: La Fea Más Bella, Ugly Betty
Spinoff series: Eco Moda, Betty Toons

El amor no es como lo pintan
(Love is not as it looks) (2000, Azteca 13, Mexico): Vanessa Acosta as Alicia "Licha" Ramírez Campos. El amor no es como lo pintan concluded in 2001.

Jassi Jaissi Koi Nahin
(There's No One Like Jassi) (2003, SET, India): Mona Singh as Jasmeet Walia. The Indian version is not so much about beauty and ugliness, as about a simple middle-class girl with strong family values being catapulted into the amoral world of high fashion upper society, although Jassi was made to appear ugly by having on thick rimmed glasses, braces and an unsightly hairstyle. Jassi Jaissi Koi Nahin concluded in 2006.

Sensiz Olmuyor

Turkey's "Sensiz Olmuyor" (Won't Work Without You) told the story of Gönül and Arda on two separate TV networks, with each channel showing thirteen episodes. When the weekly series debuted on Show TV in January 2005, Özlem Conker played Gönül (which means 'heart' in Turkish), the intelligent swan in ugly duckling clothing, and pop star Emre Altuğ appeared as her boss and love interest, Arda. The show did not go on hiatus when it was moved from Show TV to rival network Kanal D, but there was one big change: Yeliz Şar took over the role of Gönül, but the rest of the original cast remained intact.

Verliebt in Berlin
In February 2005, the German TV network, SAT 1, began airing a version called Verliebt in Berlin (The title is a word-play and can mean either In Love in Berlin or In Love with Berlin), starring local soap opera star Alexandra Neldel as Lisa Plenske and Swiss actor Mathis Künzler as David. The show had 5 million viewers daily and was extended beyond its initial 250-episode run in early 2006.

A few weeks later it was announced that the show would be renewed for a second season, but without Neldel and Künzler. The focus shifted onto a male lead character named Bruno Plenske (Lisa's half-brother, played by Tim Sander). Without Alexandra Neldel, however, the show lost much of its original appeal and dwindling ratings led to its cancellation in 2007. Verliebt in Berlin has also been broadcast in dubbed versions in Hungary (as Lisa csak egy van) and France (as Le destin de Lisa). Although Verliebt in Berlin continued with new featured characters and original storylines, it is still credited as "based on Yo Soy Betty La Fea".

Ne Rodis' Krasivoy

(Be Not Born Beautiful, from the Russian phrase, "be not born beautiful, but be born happy", "Ne Rodis' Krasivoy, Rodis' Shchastlivoy")

In 2005, STS broadcasting in Russia created a version of the show called Ne Rodis' Krasivoy starring Nelly Uvarova in the title role of Katya. This version was also broadcast throughout the former Soviet Union.

La Fea Más Bella
(The Most Beautiful Ugly Woman) (2006–2007, Televisa, Mexico): Angélica Vale as Leticia Padilla Solis.

The Mexican Televisa television network, produced its version La Fea Más Bella ("The Prettiest Ugly"), which debuted on 23 January 2006 and ended on 25 February 2007. In the United States, the series aired on Univision, and in the Philippines it was broadcast on ABC 5, where it debuted on 24 April 2006 and concluded on 25 June 2007. It was also aired in Lebanon on the Lebanese MTV network from 2009 to 2010. In both these versions, the protagonist's nickname is "Lety", which is also the name of the show in Lebanon.

Lotte

(2006, Talpa, Netherlands): Nyncke Beekhuyzen as Lotte Pronk.
In 2006, the Dutch TV network Talpa began airing Lotte, starring Nyncke Beekhuyzen as the main character and Lars Oostveen as Vico Maesland.

Yo Soy Bea
Despite the original Colombian production already being in Spanish, Telecinco launched an adaptation in Spain called Yo soy Bea in July 2006.  The Spanish version title (which translates to "I am Bea") is a pun, with "Bea" sounding like both fea ("ugly") and bella ("beautiful"), and being the short version of the protagonist name, Beatriz.  Ruth Núñez played Beatriz Pérez Pinzón and Alejandro Tous was Álvaro Aguilar, the company boss.

The Spanish adaptation screens weekdays at 6:00 pm and pulls in an average of more than four million viewers (more than +35% share of the audience). The series' record is a 42,1% of share. It has become Spain's top-rated daytime programme. Ruth Núñez, known to Spanish viewers for her portrayal of a Yugoslav student in teen soap, Compañeros, plays the heroine.

In this version, Beatriz Pérez Pinzón (Núñez) is an unattractive 26-year-old economist whose looks aren't important to her. She's intelligent and kind, and one day, after having cared for her widower father for two years, she decides to look for a job. Although she's very well educated, she gets only a secretary job at the magazine "Bulevar 21". She becomes the secretary of Álvaro Aguilar (Alejandro Tous), the company boss. In the company, Bea will be against Cayetana (Mónica Estarreado), Álvaro's fiancée, and her friend Bárbara (Norma Ruiz), who is also Álvaro's secretary.
The Spanish Version won a TP de Oro to "La mejor telenovela" in 2007.

Ugly Betty

The American production was broadcast on ABC in the United States from 28 September 2006 to 14 April 2010. This production also aired internationally on Citytv and Radio-Canada (as Chère Betty) in Canada, Channel 4 in the United Kingdom; 2007, RTÉ Two in Ireland, TV2 in New Zealand, Seven Network/7Two in Australia, TVB Pearl in Hong Kong, Nova Television in Bulgaria, 8TV in Malaysia, Studio 23 in the Philippines and STAR World in Asia (Southeast Asia, India, Philippines and Middle East feeds).

In 2004, actress Salma Hayek's production company, Ventanarosa, in a joint venture with Reveille Productions and ABC Television Studio bought the rights to Betty la fea, converting it to an English-language seriocomedy series. ABC would acquire the series under the title Ugly Betty, and initially slated the program for broadcasting in summer of 2006 as a daily series, but its success led to ABC slating it as a weekly series. The hour-long program aired Fridays at 9:00 pm (Eastern time); the first episode was broadcast 28 September 2006. Actress America Ferrera portrayed the title character Betty Suarez – an unattractive, but efficient editorial assistant at a fashion magazine.

Maria, i Aschimi
Mega Channel in Greece is airing its own version titled Maria, i Aschimi (Μαρία, Η Άσχημη – Maria, The Ugly One)
starring Aggeliki Daliani and Anthimos Ananiadis . Maria exudes intelligence, humor, and kindness, but what she is missing is conventional beauty. She considers her appearance to be an obstacle in her search for employment, despite her collection of degrees, which are displayed proudly by her parents, Kaiti and Irakles. Having no luck in her job search, Maria decides to try for a job for which she is overqualified, secretary to Alexis Mantas, the director of a noted fashion house called Ecomoda. Alexis is the most coveted bachelor in Athens, but he has recently gotten engaged to Markella, who tries to get him to choose her best friend, Lilian, to be his secretary and to keep an eye on him. Lilian doesn't have Maria's natural intelligence or fine education, but she has a beautiful appearance, which makes her a better superficial fit at the fashion house.

This adaptation was originally supposed to start airing on 1 November 2006, but within two weeks of that date the show was removed from Mega Channel's schedule. Finally, it began on 1 January 2007 at 21:00 and although it was scheduled to move at 18:15 two weeks later, due to its high ratings (± 45% according to Agb Hellas and more than 2 million viewers) finally remained in the prime-time slot of the channel.

Sara

The Flemish adaptation is called Sara, starring Veerle Baetens as Sara De Roose. The show was first broadcast on 25 September 2007 by VTM, a Flemish commercial TV-station. Sara was broadcast daily (except weekends) at 6:25 pm. On Sunday, VTM aired 'the week of Sara' at 9:25 pm, containing all the episodes of that week. Sara had a weekly audience between 650,000 and 750,000 viewers. The show ended in June 2008.

Sara works for 'Presence', where she falls in love with her boss Simon Van Wyck (Gert Winckelmans). Actors such as like Veerle Baetens, Sandrine André, Kürt Rogiers, Gert Winckelmans and Bieke Ilegems appeared on the show.

On 13 February 2008, the nominees of the Flemish TV-stars were announced. 'Sara' was nominated for 3 awards. Veerle Baetens, who plays Sara, and Sandrine Andre, who plays Britt, were both nominated in the category Best Actor or Actress. The show was nominated in the category Best Fiction programme. Veerle Baetens won in her category and also won the award as 'Most popular TV personality'. The show won the award for 'Most Popular TV Programme'.

Ne daj se, Nina

A version of Betty la Fea made by Croatian RTL Televizija and Serbian Fox Televizija begins production in October 2007. The working title of the show is "Ne daj se, Nina" ( "Don't give up, Nina"). After a long audition, newcomer Lana Gojak has been cast in the role of Nina (Betty). Other reported cast members include established actors such as Robert Kurbaša, Edvin Livarić, Bojana Ordinačev, Petar Ćiritović, Andrija Milošević, Kristina Krepela and Sloboda Mićalović.

Ošklivka Katka
(Ugly Kate) (2008, TV Prima, Czech Republic): Kateřina Janečková as Kateřina Bertoldová.
The series debuted on 3 March 2008 and it airs Mondays and Wednesdays at prime time.

Cô gái xấu xí
The Vietnamese version of Yo soy Betty, fea premiered on 11 February 2008. The series stars Ngọc Hiệp as Huyền Diệu and Chi Bảo as An Đông, the new president of SB Brands Trading J.S.C.. A number of real-life models co-starred in prominent roles, such as Nguyễn Bình Minh (who plays Tiến Mạnh), who competed in the 2002/03 Manhunt International competition and finished in the top ten; Phi Thanh Vân (as Phương Trinh), who worked as a top model and has freely admitted that she owes her beauty to the wonders of plastic surgery; Lý Anh Tuấn (Đăng Dương); and Trịnh Kim Chi (Huyền Thư). This adaptation is one of the most faithful remakes of the Colombian original so far, with episodes being recreated practically scene for scene, with only minor adjustments to account for cultural differences.

I Love Betty La Fea

Filipina actress Bea Alonzo was chosen to play the title role of Betty Pengson and actor John Lloyd Cruz to play Armando Solis in the Philippine adaptation of the famous Colombian telenovela.  The series started airing on 8 September 2008 on ABS-CBN network in primetime. Former beauty queen and actress Ruffa Gutierrez, plays the role of Daniela, the female version of Daniel from the original series. In this version, they are working for an advertising agency. This is the only version where Betty refused to have a makeover. She accepted herself in the end.

Chou Nü Wu Di
This soap opera, Ugly Wudi (literally "The Ugly Without Rival" for the name Wudi means Non-Rival, unconquerable, unbeatable or matchless), is a co-production of Televisa México, China's Hunan Satellite TV, the independent producer Nesound, and the Colombian network RCN Television. The program began broadcasting on 28 September 2008 and will be divided into five seasons of 80 half-hour chapters. The show has received some criticism via 3,300 comments on Baidu and newspaper articles stating the actress who plays Wudi isn't ugly enough, despite gaining weight and exhibiting glasses, braces and tan skin which is considered unattractive in China. Some even suggested that the name of the show be changed to Pretty Wudi.

Despite criticisms, the debut episode was watched by 73 million viewers. The show is sponsored by Unilever's Dove brand, which is woven into the plot as Wudi works on a Dove advertising campaign. The show has also been used as a way to launch Dove's Campaign for Real Beauty in China.

Four seasons of Chounu Wudi have been aired in China. The 4th season started on 20 February 2010. It was named as the final season of Chounu Wudi.

BrzydUla
Poland's adaptation of the Betty story, BrzydUla (play on words: Brzydula means ugly girl but Ula is a reference to main character's name), premiered on 6 October 2008 on the TVN network. This version stars Julia Kamińska as Ula Cieplak and Marek Włodarczyk as her father, Józef. Ula works for Marek Dobrzański (played by Filip Bobek) at a prestigious Warsaw fashion house called Dom Mody Febo & Dobrzański.

Bela, a Feia

After months of speculation, the Brazilian TV network Record officially announced on 22 May 2009 that Mexican-Brazilian actress Giselle Itié would portray Bela, the protagonist of the Brazilian version of Yo soy Betty, la Fea.  The extensive cast included Ana Roberta Gualda, André Mattos, André Segatti, Angela Leal, Aracy Cardoso, Bemvindo Sequeira, Bia Montez, Bruno Ferrari, Bárbara Borges, Carla Regina, Cláudio Gabriel, Daniel Erthal, Denise Del Vecchio, Esther Góes, Gabriela Moreira, Henri Pagnocelli, Ildi Silva, Iran Malfitano, Jonas Bloch, João Camargo, Laila Zaid, Luiza Thomé, Marcela Barrozo, Natália Guimarães, Pérola Faria, Raul Gazolla, Simone Spoladore, Sérgio Hondjakoff, Sérgio Menezes, Sílvia Pfeifer, and Thierry Figueira, with guest appearances by Babi Xavier, Gracyanne Barbosa, Rogério Fróes, Sérgio Mallandro, and Viviane Araújo. The series was produced by Record in partnership with Mexico's Televisa, which produced La Fea más bella. The story was adapted by scribe Gisele Joras and the series was directed by Edson Spinello. The novela premiered on 4 August 2009, and ended on 2 June 2010.

Gogona Gareubnidan
Georgia's version of the Betty story began on 24 May 2010, about one month after the U.S.A.'s Ugly Betty ended. The first episode was a pretty faithful remake of the pilot episode for Ugly Betty, with only minor changes, making this the first series to be adapted directly from the American Ugly Betty and not the Colombian Yo soy Betty, la fea. The series stars Tina Makharadze as Tamuna and takes place in Tbilisi, the Georgian capital (Tamuna lives in the outskirts, hence the show's title, which translates as "Girl from the Suburbs"). The first season consisted of 10 episodes and concluded on 26 July 2010. The second ran from 8 October 2010 through 31 December 2010, and consisted of 13 episodes. The second season diverged even farther from the story lines of Ugly Betty than the first season had, but many details within various episodes were directly or loosely based on details from second, third, and fourth season episodes of Ugly Betty. The third season began on 11 February 2011 without the show's leading man, Tornike Gogrichiani, who played Tamuna's boss, Nika Kekelidze. Gogrichiani was absent from the season's first four episodes and it was rumored online that he may be leaving the series altogether.

ยัยเป็ดขี้เหร่ Ugly Betty Thailand
A story of Pet (meaning 'Duck') (Pratchayanan "Babymind" Suwanmani), a young girl who looks ugly but is very capable. She works as a secretary for Danai (Wasin "Ko" Atsawanaruenat), who is a young playboy and the son of CEO of POSH Inc., a high-end cosmetics company and Ngamkhae (Nicole Theriault). Danai is the new CEO but things are not as they seem, because Danai has competition from the managing director Alisa "Alice" Phalakon (Sonia Couling) and the Phalakon family who holds shares of his company, Pet also has problems resulting from Danai's previous secretary, a young and beautiful woman.

Ellas son...la Alegría del Hogar
Original name: Ellas son...la Alegría del HogarOrigin: MexicoDate started: 2009Date ended: 2010Creator(s): Gloria Calzada, Juan Meyer, and Salvador RizoCompany(s): Televisa InternacionalFirst network to broadcast: TelevisaFirst country to adapt: United States as Devious Maids (2013)La indomable
Original name: La indomableOrigin: VenezuelaDate started: 1974Date ended: 1974First network to broadcast: Radio Caracas Televisión
First country to adapt: Mexico, as La Venganza (1977)
Related series: Marimar (1994, remake by Televisa), MariMar (2007)

Juana la virgen
Original name: Juana la virgenOrigin: VenezuelaDate started: 2002Date ended: 2003Creator: Perla FariasFirst network to broadcast: Radio Caracas TelevisiónFirst country to adapt: India (2005) as co-production between United States and Mexico (2013)Amar después de amar
Original name: Love after Loving / Amar después de amarOrigin: ArgentinaDate started: 2017Date ended: 2017Writer: Erika HalvorsenMicaela LibsonEsteban GarridoFormat Under License Form: Telefe 
Written By: Erika Halvorsen and Esteban GarridoWritten By: Erika HalvorsenMicaela LibsonEsteban GarridoFirst network to broadcast: TelefeFirst country to adapt: Mexico (2017)

Jane the Virgin
Original name: Jane the VirginOrigin: United StatesDate started: 2014Date ended: 2019Creator: Perla FariasJennie Snyder UrmanWriter: Carolina RiveraJennie Snyder UrmanMadeline HendricksRafael AgustinChantelle WellsMerigan MulhernPaul SciarrottaMicah SchraftJessica O'Toole and Amy RardinLeah LongoriaDavid S. RosenthalEmmylou DiazValentina L. GarzaCorinne BrinkerhoffDeirdre ShawJosh ReimsMeredith AverillSarah GoldfingerLiz SczudloJoni LefkowitzKatie WechGracie GlassmeyerChristopher Oscar PenaDara ResnikMichael J. CinquemaniJoe LawsonBen O'HaraExecutive producers: Ben SilvermanJennie Snyder UrmanMax RichardsCyrus FarrokhGary PearlJorge GranierTheme music composer: Gustavo SantaolallaComposer: Kevin Kiner Distributor: Propagate ContentAquarius TelevisionAquarius PicturesRCTV InternationalElectusElectus InternationalCBS Television DistributionWarner Bros. Television DistributionCBS Studios InternationalWarner Bros. International Television ProductionFirst network to broadcast: The CWFirst country to adapt: Turkey (2015)

Other versions
 In 2014, Jane the Virgin in the United States for The CW.
In 2015 (Turkish version of jane the virgin) Turkish version of the Jane the Virgin Turkish version of the series "Jane the Virgin" Aşka Gebe Hayat Mucizelere Gebe (Life Is Full of Miracles, in Turkish Life Is Full of Miracles الحياة مليئة بالمعجزات) Aska Gebe [tr] Hayat Mucizelere Gebe النسخة التركية من مسلسل Jane the Virgin Turkish adaptation jane the virgin Turkish remake jane the virgin Turkish version of the series "Jane the Virgin". Jane the Virgin (TR) Jane the Virgin / Aska Gebe in Turkey produced by Med Yapım Kanal D Distributed by Sera Film Services Medyapim for Kanal D Jane the Virgin (TR) The Turkish version of the series "Jane the Virgin" Turk remake of Jane The Virgin, titled Hayat Mucizelere Gebe.
In 2015 Hayat Mucizelere Gebe in Turkey produced by Medyapim for Kanal D
 In 2017, Parthena Zoi Παρθένα Ζωή in Greece for ANT1.
 In 2019, "Bat-El Habetula" (Bat-El the Virgin, in Hebrew בתאל הבתולה) ":he:בת אל הבתולה", in Israel for Hot (Israel).
 In 2019, "Jane the Virgin", on Netflix.
In 2019 "Mariza la virigen"(Mariza the virigin, in Spanish Mariza la virigen), In Spain and Latin America for Know channel Espana y Latin America, telefe, pol-ka, RCN Televisión, RTI Producciones, TV Azteca and Televisa.

International adaptations

L'onore e il rispetto
Original name: L'onore e il RispettoOrigin: ItalyDate started: 2006Date ended: 2017Creator: Salvatore SamperiLuigi ParisiAlessio InturriFirst network to broadcast: Canale 5First country to adapt: Turkey (2014)

Mi Gorda Bella
Original name: Mi Gorda BellaOrigin: VenezuelaDate started: 2002Date ended: 2003Creator: Carolina EspadaFirst network to broadcast: Radio Caracas TelevisiónFirst country to adapt: India (2004)Related series (loosely based on): Betty La Fea, La Fea Más Bella, Ugly Betty
Related series (adapted from the original): Dekho Magar Pyaar Se, Llena de amor

La ronca de oro
Original name: La ronca de oroOrigin: ColombiaDate started: 2014Date ended: 2014First network to broadcast: Caracol TelevisiónFirst country to adapt: Egypt (2015)

My Lovely Sam Soon
Original name: My Lovely Sam SoonOrigin: South KoreaDate started: 2005Date ended: 2005Creator: Kim Do-WoFirst network to broadcast: MBCFirst country to adapt: Philippines, as Ako si Kim Samsoon (2008)Two Wives
Original name: Two WivesOrigin: South KoreaDate started: 2009Date ended: 2009Creator: Lee Yoo-seonFirst network to broadcast: SBSFirst country to adapt: PhilippinesSorelle
Original name: SorelleOrigin: ItalyDate started: 2017Date ended: 2017Creator: Ivan Cotroneo, Monica RamettaDistributor: Endemol Shine GroupEndemol Shine Middle EastEndemol Shine GroupEndemol Shine ItalyEagle Filmsزي الشمس النسخة العربية عن مسلسل "Sorelle" 2017 اينديمول شاين - أيطاليا مقتبسة من مسلسل إيطالي بعنوان (الأخوات)First network to broadcast: Rai 1First country to adapt: Egypt (2019)

Mentre ero via
Original name: Mentre ero via (While I Was Away)Origin: ItalyDate started: 2019Date ended: 2019Creator: Ivan Cotroneo, Monica RamettaDistributor: Endemol Shine GroupEndemol Shine Middle EastEndemol Shine GroupEndemol Shine ItalyIProductionsFirst network to broadcast: Rai 1First country to adapt: Egypt (2020)
Format based on a Rai Fiction and Endemol Shine Italy Coproduction © 2018 Endemol Shine Italy S.p.A.  / 2019 RAI Radiotelevisione italiana S.p.a Subject by Ivan Cotroneo and Monica Rametta Format Distributed by Endemol Shine IP B.V.

Terminales
Original name: TerminalesOrigin: MexicoDate started: 2008Date ended: 2008Creator: Ricardo Tadeo Álvarez CanalesMiguel Ángel Fox MullerMaría del Socorro González OcampoPedro Armando Rodríguez MontesMarco Antonio Lagarde BedollaPatricio Saiz ValenzuelaFirst network to broadcast: TelevisaFirst country to adapt: Spain (2010)

Resistire
Original name: ResistiréOrigin: ArgentinaDate started: 2003Date ended: 2003Creator: Gustavo BelattiMario SegadeFirst network to broadcast: TelefeFirst country to adapt: Mexican (2006)

El regreso de Lucas
Original name: El regreso de Lucas The Return of LucasOrigin: ArgentinaDate started: 2016Date ended: 2016Creator and Writer: Bruno LucianiMartín MéndezFirst network to broadcast: TelefeAmérica TelevisiónFirst country to adapt: Egypt (2018)

Acacias 38
Original name: Acacias 38Origin: SpainDate started: 2015Date ended: 2021Creator: Josep Cister RubioSusana López RubioAurora GuerraMiquel PeidróFirst network to broadcast: La 1First country to adapt: Egypt (2018)

Gran Hotel
Original name: Gran HotelOrigin: SpainDate started: 2011Date ended: 2013Creator: Ramón CamposGema R. NeiraFirst network to broadcast: Antena 3First country to adapt: Italy (2015)

Карамель
Original name: Карамель Karamel CaramelOrigin: RussiaDate started: 2011Date ended: 2011First network to broadcast: TV-3First country to adapt: Lebanon (2017)

Polseres vermelles
Original name: Polseres vermelles The Red Band SocietyOrigin: SpainDate started: 2011Date ended: 2013Creator: Albert EspinosaExecutive producers: Albert EspinosaPau Freixas Distributor: Filmax InternationalFirst network to broadcast: TV3First country to adapt: Italy (2014)

Primera dama
Original name: Primera dama The First Lady	Origin: ChileDate started: 2010Date ended: 2011Creator: Sebastián ArrauDistributor: Latin Media CorporationFirst network to broadcast: Canal 13First country to adapt: Colombia (2011)

Drop Dead Diva
Original name: Drop Dead DivaOrigin: United StatesDate started: 2009Date ended: 2014Creator: Josh BermanFirst network to broadcast: LifetimeFirst country to adapt: Russia (2013)

Remakes
In 2017, South Korean TV network MBC announced that it will broadcast a local remake of the series, titled Goddess of the Court. Jointly produced by Sony Pictures Television and local production company Redwoods (the company behind the hit 2015-2016 TV series Six Flying Dragons), it is planned for broadcast on the network's Wednesday-Thursday primetime slot in early 2018. SPT also plans to broadcast the series on its owned-and-operated channels across 160 countries, including Sony One.

Arabic version
In 2018, An Arabic version was produced under Arabic announced that it will broadcast a TV network OSN announced that it will broadcast a local remake of the series, the name titled طلعت روحي (Teleat Rohi (Drop Dead Diva) 
. Jointly produced by Sony Pictures Television and local production company Beelink Productions

Primetime dramas

24
Original name 24
Origin: United StatesDate started: November 5, 2001
Creator: Joel Surnow, Robert Cochran 
First network to broadcast: FOX
First country to adapt: India (24, 2013)
Related series: 24: Conspiracy, 24: Redemption, The Rookie, 24: Live Another Day, 24: Legacy

 9-1-1 
Original name: 9-1-1
Origin: United StatesDate started: January 3, 2018
Date ended: Present
Creator: Ryan Murphy, Brad Falchuk & Tim MinearFirst network to broadcast: FOX
Related series: 9-1-1 and 9-1-1: Lone Star

Arrowverse
Original name: Arrow ArrowverseOrigin: United StatesDate started: October 10, 2012
Creator: Greg Berlanti, Andrew Kreisberg, Marc Guggenheim, Phil Klemmer & Geoff JohnsFirst network to broadcast: The CW
Related series: The Flash, Constantine, Vixen, Legends of Tomorrow, Supergirl, Black Lightning, Batwoman and Superman & Lois

Babylon 5
Original name: Babylon 5Origin: United StatesDate started: February 22, 1993
Date ended: November 25, 1998
Creator: J. Michael StraczynskiFirst network to broadcast: PTEN
Related series: Crusade, plus six TV films

Battlestar Galactica
Original name: Battlestar GalacticaOrigin: United StatesDate started: September 17, 1978
Date ended: April 29, 1979
Creator: Glen A. LarsonFirst network to broadcast: ABC
Related series: Galactica 1980, Battlestar Galactica (2004), Caprica, three TV films

Breaking Bad
Original name: Breaking BadOrigin: United StatesDate started: January 20, 2008
Creator: Vince GilliganFirst network to broadcast: AMC
Related series:  Talking Bad, Better Call Saul, Talking Saul, El Camino: A Breaking Bad Movie, The Broken and the Bad
First country to adapt: Colombia (Metástasis, 2014) 
Other franchise ties: The X-Files, The Walking Dead

Chicago Fire
Original name: Chicago FireOrigin: United StatesDate started: 2012
Date ended: Present
Creator: Dick Wolf, Matt Olmstead, Michael Brandt, and Derek HaasFirst network to broadcast: NBC
Other franchise ties: Law & OrderRelated series: Chicago P.D., Chicago Med, and Chicago Justice

Criminal Minds
Original name: Criminal MindsOrigin: United StatesDate started: September 22, 2005
Creator(s): Jeff DavisFirst network to broadcast: CBS 
Related series: Criminal Minds: Suspect Behavior, Criminal Minds: Beyond Borders

CSI
Original name: CSI: Crime Scene InvestigationOrigin: United StatesDate started: October 6, 2000
Creator: Anthony ZuikerFirst network to broadcast: CBS
Related series: CSI: Miami, CSI: NY, Without A Trace, Cold Case and CSI: Cyber

Dallas
Original name: DallasOrigin: United StatesDate started: 1978
Creator: David JacobsFirst network to broadcast: CBS
Related series: Knots Landing, Dallas (2012), two TV films

Doctor Who
Original name: Doctor WhoOrigin: United KingdomDate started: 23 November 1963
Date ended: ongoing
Creator: Sydney Newman, C.E. Webber (and others)
First network to broadcast: BBC
First country to adapt: United States (1996; considered part of continuing series because Sylvester McCoy passed the role to Paul McGann in the TV pilot)
Related series: K-9 & Company, Torchwood, The Sarah Jane Adventures, Class,  two films produced in the 1960s, Big Finish audio dramas

The Equalizer
Original name: The EqualizerOrigin: United StatesDate started: September 23, 1985
Date ended: May 2, 1989
Creator: Michael Sloan and Richard LindheimFirst network to broadcast: CBS
Second generation related series: The Equalizer (2021 reboot), plus two films (2014 and 2018)

ER
Original name: EROrigin: United StatesDate started: September 19, 1994
Date ended: April 2, 2009
Creator: Michael CrichtonFirst network to broadcast: NBC
Other franchise ties: Third Watch and Medical Investigation

Grey's Anatomy
Original name: Grey's AnatomyOrigin: United StatesDate started: March 27, 2005
Creator: Shonda RhimesFirst network to broadcast: ABC
Related series: Private Practice, Station 19

Hawaii Five-O
Original name: Hawaii Five-OOrigin: United StatesDate started: 1968
Date ended: present
Creator: Leonard FreemanFirst network to broadcast: CBS
Second generation related series: Hawaii Five-0 (2010 reboot; acknowledges ties to the original)
Second generation other franchise ties: NCIS: Los Angeles, MacGyver, Magnum P.I.

Kung Fu
Original name: Kung FuOrigin: United StatesDate started: 1972
Date ended: 1975
Creator: Ed Spielman, Jerry Thorpe and Herman MillerFirst network to broadcast: ABC
Spin-off series: Kung Fu: The Legend Continues (1993-1997)
Second generation related series: Kung Fu (2021 reboot)

L.A. Law
Original name: L.A. LawOrigin: United StatesDate started: 1986
Creator:
First network to broadcast: NBC
Other franchise ties: Civil Wars and L.A. Law: The Movie

Law & Order
Original name: Law & OrderOrigin: United StatesDate started: September 13, 1990
Date ended: May 24, 2010
Creator: Dick WolfFirst network to broadcast: NBC
Other franchise ties: The X-Files, Chicago
First country to adapt: France (Paris enquêtes criminelles, 2007) 
Related series: Law & Order: Special Victims Unit, Law & Order: LA, Law & Order: Criminal Intent, Law & Order: UK, Law & Order: Trial by Jury, Law & Order, Crime & Punishment, Conviction, Homicide: Life on the Street

Matlock
Original name: MatlockOrigin: United StatesDate started: September 23, 1986
Date ended: April 26, 2002
Creator(s): Dean Hargrove, Joel Steiger, Joyce BurdittFirst network to broadcast: NBC
Related series: Jake and the Fatman and Diagnosis: Murder

Medical Investigation
Original name: Medical InvestigationOrigin: United StatesDate started: September 9, 2004
Date ended: March 25, 2005
Creator: Jason HorwitchFirst network to broadcast: NBC
Other franchise ties: Third WatchNCIS
Original name: JAGOrigin: United StatesDate started: September 23, 1995
Creator(s): Donald P. BellisarioFirst network to broadcast: NBC 
Related series: First Monday, NCIS, NCIS: Los Angeles, Hawaii Five-0, MacGyver, NCIS: New Orleans, NCIS: Hawaiʻi and ScorpionNYPD Blue
Original name: NYPD BlueOrigin: United StatesDate started: September 21, 1993
Date ended: March 1, 2005
Creator(s): Steven Bochco, David MilchFirst network to broadcast: ABC
Related series: Public MoralsOnce Upon a Time
Original name: Once Upon a TimeOrigin: United StatesDate started: 2011
Date ended: 2018
Creator: Edward Kitsis and Adam Horowitz
First network to broadcast: ABC (United States, as they are the co-producers), although CTV in Canada aired it an hour before the US telecast during its first three seasons, which would make them the first international network to air the series
Related series: Once Upon a Time in Wonderland
Other franchise ties: Lost and Disney-related franchises

The Practice
Original name: The PracticeOrigin: United StatesDate started: March 4, 1997
Date ended: December 8, 2008
Creator: David E. KelleyFirst network to broadcast: ABC
Related series: Boston Legal and Boston Public
Other franchise ties: Ally McBeal

Sons of Anarchy
Original name: Sons of AnarchyOrigin: United StatesDate started: September 3, 2008
Creator: Kurt Sutter
First network to broadcast: FX
Related series: Mayans M.C.

Star Trek
Original name: Star TrekOrigin: United StatesDate started: 1966 (TV series); 1979 (film series)
Date ended: ongoing (TV); ongoing (film)
Creator: Gene RoddenberryFirst network to broadcast: NBC
Related series: Star Trek: The Animated Series, Star Trek: The Next Generation, Star Trek: Deep Space Nine, Star Trek: Voyager, Star Trek: Enterprise, Star Trek: Discovery, Star Trek: Lower Decks, Star Trek: Picard Star Trek: Short Treks, Star Trek: Strange New Worlds plus a film series (13 films as of 2016)

Stargate: SG-1
Original name: Stargate SG-1Origin: United StatesDate started: 1997
Date ended: 2007
Creator: Brad Wright & Jonathan GlassnerFirst network to broadcast: Showtime
Related series: Stargate Infinity, Stargate Atlantis and Stargate Universe

Walker, Texas Ranger
Original name: Walker, Texas RangerOrigin: United StatesDate started: April 21, 1993
Creator(s): Christopher Canaan, Albert S. Ruddy, Leslie Greif, Paul Haggis, Aaron Norris, Chuck NorrisFirst network to broadcast: CBS
Related series: Sons of Thunder, Martial Law, Early Edition, Walker

The Walking Dead
Original name: The Walking DeadOrigin: United StatesDate started: October 31, 2010
Creator: Frank DarabontFirst network to broadcast: AMC
Related series: Talking Dead, Fear the Walking Dead, The Walking Dead: World Beyond

The X-Files
Original name: The X-FilesOrigin: United StatesDate started: September 10, 1993
Creator: Chris CarterFirst network to broadcast: Fox
Related series: The Lone Gunmen, Millennium
Other franchise ties: Law & Order

Yellowstone
Original name: YellowstoneOrigin: United StatesDate started: June 20, 2018
Creator: Taylor SheridanFirst network to broadcast: Paramount Network
Related series: 1883, 1923, 6666, 1883: The Bass Reeves Story

Anime

A number of Anime TV shows have been both long running, and produced various individual titles existing in the same universe, as part of the franchise

Gundam
Original name: Mobile Suit GundamOrigin: JapanDate started: April 7, 1979
Creator: Hajime YatateRelated series: Mobile Suit Gundam, Mobile Suit Zeta Gundam, Mobile Suit Gundam ZZ, Mobile Suit SD Gundam, Mobile Suit Victory Gundam, Mobile Fighter G Gundam, Mobile Suit Gundam Wing, After War Gundam X, Turn A Gundam, Mobile Suit Gundam SEED, Superior Defender Gundam Force, Mobile Suit Gundam SEED Destiny, Mobile Suit Gundam 00, Mobile Suit Gundam Unicorn, SD Gundam Sangokuden Brave Battle Warriors, Mobile Suit Gundam AGE, Gundam Reconguista in G, Gundam Build Fighters Try, Mobile Suit Gundam: Iron-Blooded Orphans, Gundam Build Divers,  (Plus numerous Cinema Movies and other media)

Astro Boy (1980 TV series)

Original Name: Tetsuwan atomu,

Origin: Japan

Date Started: Oct 1, 1980

Creator: Osamu Tezuka

Related Series: Astro Boy (2003 TV series) Astro Boy (1963 TV series) Astro Boy (film)

Children's television

Barney
Original name: Barney & FriendsOrigin: United StatesDate started: 1988 (character and video series Barney and the Backyard Gang), 1992 (TV)
Creators: Sheryl Leach and Kathy ParkerFirst network to broadcast: Public Broadcasting Service
First country to adapt: Israel

Bozo the Clown
Original name: Bozo's CircusOrigin: United StatesDate started: 1946 (character), 1949 (TV)
Date ended: early 1970s (most markets), 2001 (as WGN-TV's The Bozo Super Sunday Show)
Creator: Alan W. LivingstonFirst station to broadcast: KTTV/Los Angeles, California

Hi-5
Original name: Hi-5Origin: AustraliaDate started: June–August 1998 (music group), 12 April 1999 (original TV series), 15 May 2017 (TV series revival)
Date ended: 16 December 2011 (original TV series), 16 June 2017 (TV series revival), November 2019 (music group)
Creators: Helena Harris and Posie Graeme-EvansFirst network to broadcast: Nine Network
First country to adapt: United States

Romper Room
Original name: Romper RoomOrigin: United StatesDate started: 1953Date ended: 1981 (US Franchised/local versions); 1994 (US syndicated version)
Creator: Nancy ClasterFirst station to broadcast: WBAL-TV/Baltimore, Maryland
First country to adapt: Canada (local version at CKLW-TV/Windsor, Ontario, 1954)

Sesame Street

Original name: Sesame StreetOrigin: United StatesDate started: 1969Creators: Joan Ganz Cooney and Lloyd MorrisettFirst network to broadcast: National Educational TelevisionFirst country to adapt: Brazil

Blue's Clues

Original name: Blue's CluesOrigin: United StatesDate started: 1996Creators: Traci Paige Johnson Todd Kessler and Angela C. SantomeroFirst network to broadcast: Nick Jr.First country to adapt: United Kingdom

Talk shows

AM
Original name: Ralph Story's AMOrigin: United StatesDate started: 1971Creator: Ralph StoryFirst network to broadcast: KABC-TV
Related series: AM America, AM Los Angeles/Live with Regis and Kathie Lee/Live! with Kelly, AM Chicago/The Oprah Winfrey Show, AM Buffalo, Morning Exchange
Second-generation related series: Dr. Oz, Dr. Phil, The Gayle King Show, The Nate Berkus Show, Good Morning America
Third-generation related series: The Doctors

Note: Canada AM is unrelated to this franchise and predates it.

The Jerry Springer Show
Original name: The Jerry Springer ShowOrigin: United StatesDate started: 1991Creator: Jerry SpringerFirst station to broadcast: WLWT/Cincinnati, Ohio
First country to adapt: United Kingdom (as The Springer Show)
Related series (UK): The Jeremy Kyle Show
Related series (US): The Steve Wilkos Show, Judge Jerry
Second-generation related series (US): The Jeremy Kyle Show

The Maury Povich Show
Original name: The Maury Povich ShowOrigin: United StatesDate started: 1990Date ended: 1998 
Creator: Maury Povich
First station to broadcast: US syndication
Related series: The Montel Williams Show, Maury
Second-generation related series: Trisha
Franchise ties: Sally Jessy Raphaël / Sally, The Jerry Springer Show, The Steve Wilkos Show

Ricki Lake
Original name: Ricki LakeOrigin: United StatesDate started: 1993Date ended: 2004 
Creator: Garth Ancier, Gail Steinberg, Ricki Lake
First station to broadcast: US syndication
Related series: Jane (1992), Tempestt, Carnie!, Life & Style
Second-generation related series: The Ricki Lake Show

The Rosie O'Donnell Show
Original name: The Rosie O'Donnell ShowOrigin: United StatesDate started: 1996Date ended: 2002 
Creator: Rosie O'Donnell
First station to broadcast: US syndication
Related series: The Caroline Rhea Show, The Bonnie Hunt Show
Second-generation related series: The Ellen DeGeneres Show
Second-generation spin-off related series: Bethenny (also tied to the Real Housewives reality franchise)
Third-generation related series: The Rosie Show
Other franchise ties: The Oprah Winfrey Show, Real Housewives, Carnie!

Newscasts

60 Minutes
Original name: 60 MinutesOrigin: United StatesDate started: 1968Creator: Don HewittFirst network to broadcast: CBSFirst country to adapt: Australia 60 Minutes

Adaptations include 60 Minutes (New Zealand) and versions in Germany, Mexico, Peru and Portugal. The series has also been franchised in re-versioned cable episodes in the U.S. and even on CBS itself (see 60 Minutes II).

Action News
Original name: Rock 'n' Roll Radio News / Action NewsOrigin: United StatesDate started: under current name: 1972; original format: 1958
Creators: Irv Weinstein (original format), Mel Kampmann (franchise)
First station to broadcast: WFIL-TV
First country to adapt: AustraliaEyewitness News
Original name: Eyewitness NewsOrigin: United StatesDate started: 1970Creator: Al PrimoFirst station to broadcast: WABC-TV
First country to adapt: AustraliaMeet the Press
Original name: American Mercury Presents Meet the PressOrigin: United StatesDate started: 1945Creators: Martha Rountree and Lawrence E. SpivakFirst network to broadcast: MutualFirst country to adapt: Australia (Meet the Press)

News Central
Original name: News CentralOrigin: United StatesDate started: 2003Date ended: 2006Creator: Sinclair Broadcast GroupFirst station to broadcast (flagship station): WBFFRelated series: The Point, Washington Newsroom, Full Measure with Sharyl Attkisson

NewsCenter / NotiCentro
Original name: NotiCentro (Latin America), The Sixth/Eleventh Hour (United States)
Origin: Puerto RicoDate started: 1967 (original usage), 1974 (NBC franchise)
First station to broadcast: WAPA-TV
First country to adapt: United StatesRelated series: NewsChannel, News 4 New York, Channel # News (with local variants)

The name was also used in Canada, Brazil, Australia, Italy and Japan.

SportsCenter
Original name: SportsCenterOrigin: United StatesDate started: 1979Creator: John A. WalshFirst station to broadcast: ESPNAdaptations include SportsCenter Asia and Canada's SportsCentre.

Variety shows

All That
Original name: All ThatOrigin: United StatesDate started: 1994Creator: Dan Schneider, Mike Tollin, and Brian RobbinsFirst network to broadcast: NickelodeonSpin-off series: Action League Now, The Amanda Show, Keenan and Kel, The Nick Cannon Show
Related series: Sonny With a Chance, So Random

Eat Bulaga!
Original name: Eat Bulaga!Origin: PhilippinesDate started: July 30, 1979Creator: TAPE Inc.First network to broadcast: RPN (now airs in GMA Network)
First country to adapt: Indonesia as The New Eat Bulaga! Indonesia (2014–present) (formerly known as Eat Bulaga! Indonesia; 2012–2014)
Related series: The Ryzza Mae Show (2013-2015)

 Hee Haw 
Original name: Hee HawOrigin: United StatesDate started: June 15, 1969Creators: Frank Peppiatt and John Aylesworth
First network to broadcast: CBS
Related series: Hee Haw Honeys, Hee Haw Silver
Other franchise ties: The Jimmy Dean Show, The Sonny & Cher Show

 It's Showtime 
Original name: It's ShowtimeOrigin: PhilippinesDate started: October 24, 2009Creator: ABS-CBNFirst network to broadcast: ABS-CBNFirst country to adapt: Indonesia as It's Showtime Indonesia (2019–present) on MNCTV

Rowan & Martin's Laugh-In
Original name: Rowan & Martin's Laugh-InOrigin: United StatesDate started: January 22, 1968Date ended: March 12, 1973Creator: Dan Rowan, Dick Martin, and George SchlatterFirst network to broadcast: NBCFirst country to adapt: Philippines as Super Laff-In (1969)
Related series: Turn-On 
Spin-off series: Letters to Laugh-In, Baggy Pants and the Nitwits

 2 Days & 1 Night! 
Original name: 1박 2일 (1 Night 2 Days) 2 Days & 1 Night!
Origin: South KoreaDate started: August 5, 2007Creator: Korean Broadcasting SystemFirst network to broadcast: KBS2First country to adapt: China as 2天1夜

 You Can't Do That On Television 
Original name: You Can't Do That On TelevisionOrigin: CanadaDate started: 1979Date ended: 1990Creators: Roger Price and Geoffrey Darby
First network to broadcast: CTV'''
First country to adapt: United States, as Don't Look Now (1983)
Spin-off series: Turkey Television, UFO Kidnapped, Whatever Turns You OnRelated series: All That, The Amanda Show''

See also
 Media franchise
 List of multimedia franchises
 Reality television
 The X-Files franchise
 Buffyverse
 List of American television series based on British television series
 List of British television series based on American television series
List of multimedia franchises originating in television series

References

Franchises
Lists of media franchises

Television shows remade overseas